Aleksandr Ivanovich Podolyak (born 5 January 1962) is a former Russian football player.

References

1962 births
Sportspeople from Kursk
Living people
Soviet footballers
FC Kuban Krasnodar players
FC Lokomotiv Moscow players
FC Fakel Voronezh players
Russian footballers
Russian Premier League players
FC Nyva Vinnytsia players
Russian expatriate footballers
Expatriate footballers in Ukraine
Association football midfielders
FC Avangard Kursk players